The Hertfordshire Police and Crime Commissioner is the police and crime commissioner, an elected official tasked with setting out the way crime is tackled by Hertfordshire Police in the English County of Hertfordshire. The post was created in November 2012, following an election held on 15 November 2012, and replaced the Hertfordshire Police Authority.

The Commissioner's role is to hold the police and the chief constable to account on behalf of the public, and to set the strategic direction of the force through the Police Crime Plan. The office is based at Harpenden Police Station.

The current incumbent is David Lloyd, who represents the Conservative Party. He was first elected in 2012 and re-elected to the role at subsequent elections, most recently in May 2021.

List of Hertfordshire Police and Crime Commissioners

References

Police and crime commissioners in England